Vatakkiruttal ('fasting facing north'), also Vadakiruthal and vadakiruttal, was a Tamil ritual of fasting till death. It was especially widespread during the Sangam age. The Tamil kings, in order to save their honour, and prestige, were prepared to meet their death facing North ('Vatakkiruttal') and never would they turn their back in battle. It was a Tamil martial ('vow'). This was either done alone, or as a group with the supporters of the captured king.

Examples 
Few examples for Vatakkiruttal for friendship:

After the death of king Vēl Pāri in a battle, his friend poet Kapilar perform this act in Kabilar Kundru. In another, King Kopperuncholan and his friend poet Pisiranthaiyar did Vatakkiruttal.

References

Further reading 
 
 
 

Tamil martial arts
Tamil culture
Suicide methods